Burnett is an unincorporated community in Otter Creek Township, Vigo County, in the U.S. state of Indiana.

It is part of the Terre Haute Metropolitan Statistical Area.

History
Burnett was founded by Stephen Grover Burnett and his wife Hanna Creal Burnett c. 1835. By 1890, it had an active post office and a practicing physician, Dr. Seth B. Melton. The post office at Burnett was established in 1870, and remained in operation until it was discontinued in 1934.

Geography

References

Unincorporated communities in Vigo County, Indiana
Unincorporated communities in Indiana
Terre Haute metropolitan area